ShareChat is an Indian social media platform, owned by Bangalore-based Mohalla Tech Pvt Ltd. It was founded by Ankush Sachdeva, Bhanu Pratap Singh and Farid Ahsan, and incorporated on 8 January 2015. ShareChat app has over 350 million monthly active users across 15 Indian languages.

Mohalla Tech is the parent company of applications such as ShareChat, Moj and Moj  Lite + (TakaTak). It acquired MX TakaTak, one of the largest homegrown short video platforms in February 2022. The current valuation of the company is $5 billion.

Foundation and history 
ShareChat's holding company, Mohalla Tech Pvt Ltd, was incorporated in January 2015 by three IIT Kanpur graduates— Ankush Sachdeva, Bhanu Pratap Singh and Farid Ahsan. The company is headquartered in Bengaluru, Karnataka, and presently employs over 2500 people.

Initially, ShareChat primarily worked as a content sharing platform, without any scope of users generating their own content. In April 2016, ShareChat enabled user-generated content creation on its platform, allowing its users to share their own posters and creative content. At around the same time, it also introduced open tagging for users, which would allow anyone to create their own hashtags depending on the content.

The key people at the hierarchy of ShareChat include Ankush Sachdeva (co-founder and Chief Executive Officer), Farid Ahsan (co-founder and Chief Operating Officer), and Bhanu Pratap Singh (co-founder and Chief Technical Officer) All of the co-founders featured in Forbes’ 30 under 30 Asia 2018, having been recognised for their work with language-first approach in the social media landscape. In the wake of the ban on TikTok by the Indian government in June 2020, ShareChat launched the similar Moj app and grew substantially.

Funding 
In September 2020, ShareChat raised $40 million from investors Dr. Pawan Munjal of Hero MotoCorp, Ajay Shridhar Shriram of DCM Shriram, Twitter, SAIF Partners, Lightspeed Ventures and India Quotient. By April 2021 ShareChat had raised $500 million from investors and was valued at over $2 billion. In May 2022, ShareChat raised $300 million from Google, Times Group and Temasek Holdings at a valuation of $5 billion.

Acquisitions 

In March 2019, Mohalla Tech acquired Transversal Tech-owned short video sharing platform, Clip. In February 2020, it acquired Bengaluru-based online fashion marketplace Elanic. In March 2020, it acquired a meme discovery and sharing platform, Memer. In August 2020, it acquired a hyperlocal information platform, Circle Internet. Sharechat parent company also bought MX TakaTak from Times Internet Group for $700 million in one of the biggest acquisitions of 2022.

Initiatives against misinformation 
On April 17, 2019, ShareChat took down around half a million pieces of content and removed 54,000 accounts for spreading fake news, hate speech, spam and conducting coordinated misinformation campaign.

HR policies for women 
ShareChat (Mohalla Tech Pvt Ltd.) announced the following HR policies for women in 2022 to build a nurturing and conducive environment for its workforce.

 Five days leave to take care of exigencies related to the health & education of the children
 26 weeks leave to adoptive mothers of children below six months and 12 weeks for children aged above that
 Five days of miscarriage caregiver leave for male employees to support their partners
 Nanny expenses of INR 7000 to women employees per child up to six years of age
 12 weeks of leave for commissioning mothers

Issues 

 ShareChat accused Bytedance of copying its design: Helo, another social media platform that was owned by TikTok's parent company, Bytedance is one of ShareChat’s competitors. Bytedance has been accused by ShareChat of copying its design and UI pixel to pixel in 2018. Following Delhi High Court's direction, Bytedance changed its design for Helo.
 Layoffs and rehiring: ShareChat laid off 101 employees in May 2020 and since, ShareChat rehired over 50% of the laid-off workforce with the success of its newly launched video platform, Moj. It is also expected to hire 150-200 more people by March 2021. In December 2022, ShareChat laid off another 5% of its workforce.

Apps 

ShareChat app

ShareChat app is multilingual social media platform, with 180 million monthly active users. It offers its users multiple options to express themselves through audio chat rooms, photo & video posts, status updates, microblogging, blogging and direct messaging in 15 Indic languages. This allows regional audiences to connect with like-minded users and communities.

Features:

 Audio chat rooms: ShareChat audio chatroom is voice-based hangout destination. This feature allows its users to discuss various topics in detail across 15 regional languages.
 Virtual gifting: ShareChat also offers Virtual Gifting where users can reward their favourite creator or host through digital tokens as a gesture of appreciation for their content. So far, Virtual Gifting has supported over 64,000 creators to monetise their content.
 SCTV: SCTV is a long-form video format that allows users to create elaborate videos ranging from 2 to 15 minutes.

Moj app

ShareChat's app Moj, launched on 29 June 2020, is a short-video platform that emulates the features of TikTok, which was among the apps banned by the Indian government in June 2020.

In a tweet, Ankush Sachdeva, co-founder and CEO of ShareChat, said the app was coded in 30 hours. It has received Google Play Best of 2020 Awards, as of 1 December 2020.

Moj today has emerged as India's number one short video app with the highest monthly active users. It has over 160 million monthly active users. In a recent feature by TechCrunch, Moj was positioned as #1 short video platform in India, beating others like MX TakaTak, Josh and Roposo.

See also
 Chingari (app)
 Koo (social network)

References

External links 
 

Mobile social software
Indian companies established in 2015
Freeware
Social media companies
Social networking services
Social networks